Dream.7: Feather Weight Grandprix 2009 1st Round was a mixed martial arts event promoted by Fighting and Entertainment Group's (FEG) mixed martial arts promotion Dream on March 8, 2009.  This event featured six of the opening round fights of the tournament which is contested at a  weight limit.

Event
The event consisted of nine mixed martial arts bout, all contested under Dream's MMA rules. Six of the bouts were part of Dream's 2009 Featherweight Grand Prix, with the remaining bout of the tournament's opening round (DJ Taiki's fight with Hideo Tokoro) taking place at Dream.8 due to DJ Taiki being injured. Norifumi "Kid" Yamamoto who is  also participating in the tournament was given a first-round bye by FEG so he could recover from an ankle injury he received in 2008.

Results

See also 
 Dream (mixed martial arts)
 List of Dream champions
 2009 in DREAM

References

External links
Official fightcard

Dream (mixed martial arts) events
2009 in mixed martial arts
Sport in Saitama (city)
Mixed martial arts in Japan
2009 in Japan